The Monumenta Germaniae Historica (MGH) is a comprehensive series of carefully edited and published primary sources, both chronicle and archival, for the study of Northwestern and Central European history from the end of the Roman Empire to 1500. Despite the name, the series covers important sources for the history of many countries besides Germany, since the Society for the Publication of Sources on Germanic Affairs of the Middle Ages has included documents from many other areas subjected to the influence of Germanic tribes or rulers (Britain, Czech lands, Poland, Austria, France, Low Countries, Italy, Spain, etc.). The editor from 1826 until 1874 was Georg Heinrich Pertz (1795–1876); in 1875 he was succeeded by Georg Waitz (1813–1886).

History
The MGH was founded in Hanover as a private text publication society by the Prussian reformer Heinrich Friedrich Karl Freiherr vom Stein in 1819. The first volume appeared in 1826. The editor from 1826 until 1874 was Georg Heinrich Pertz, who was succeeded by Georg Waitz. Many eminent medievalists from Germany and, eventually, other countries, joined in the project of searching out and comparing manuscripts and producing scholarly editions. The motto chosen, Sanctus amor patriae dat animum ("Holy love for the fatherland gives the spirit"), is explained as linking Romantic nationalism with professional scholarship. In 1875, the MGH was established as a more formal institution with headquarters in Berlin. 

In 1935, the organization was taken over by the state and renamed the Reichsinstitut für ältere deutsche Geschichtskunde (National Institute for Older German History). This was abolished in 1945, at the end of World War II. 

However, the institute was subsequently revived under its original name with the support of German institutions and the Austrian Academy of Sciences. The Monumenta Germaniae Historica Institute has been located in Munich since 1949 and possesses a large specialized library on the medieval history of Germany and Europe, including Church history, along with 130,000 monographs and approximately 150,000 dependent writings. It moved into its current premises in the building of the Bavarian State Library in 1967.

The project, a major effort of historical scholarship, continues in the 21st century. In 2004 the MGH, with the support of the Deutsche Forschungsgemeinschaft, made all of its publications in print for more than five years available online, in photo-digital reproduction, via a link on the MGH homepage.

Divisions
The series falls into five main divisions, Antiquitates, Diplomata, Epistolae, Leges and Scriptores, with an additional smaller division of Necrologia. Many subsidiary series have also been established, including a series of more compact volumes for school use (Scriptores in usum scholarum) and special studies (MGH Schriften).

See also
 Historiography of Germany
Wilhelm Levison

References

Bibliography
  Reprinted in

External links
2015 list of publications 
The MGH homepage 
Digital MGH homepage 
Monumenta Germaniae Historica on Archive.org 

1826 non-fiction books
Book series introduced in 1826
History books about Germany
Series of books
Documents
Text publication societies
19th-century history books
Academic publishing
19th-century Latin books
Germanic studies